The Ministry of Finance and Treasury of Bosnia and Herzegovina is the governmental department which oversees the public finances of Bosnia and Herzegovina.

History
After the first post-war 1996 Bosnian general election, the responsibilities of the current Ministry of Finance and Treasury of Bosnia and Herzegovina were first in the entity ministries of finance, the Ministry of Finance of the Federation of Bosnia and Herzegovina and the Republika Srpska.

However, the Ministry of Finance and Treasury of Bosnia and Herzegovina was established in 2000, and was in another government between the Party of Democratic Action (SDA), the Serb Democratic Party (SDS) and the Croatian Democratic Union of Bosnia and Herzegovina (HDZ BiH), and after the 1998 Bosnian general election began operating under the auspices of the Minister for Treasury of the Institutions of Bosnia and Herzegovina, who was then Spasoje Tuševljak (SDS).

Organization
The Ministry of Finance and Treasury of Bosnia and Herzegovina consists of a total of eleven organizational units.

Cabinet of the Minister
Cabinet of the Deputy Minister
Cabinet of the Secretary of the Minister
Sector for legal, personnel, general and financial affairs
Sector for Budget of Institutions of Bosnia and Herzegovina
Sector for relations with financial institutions
Public Debt Sector
Sector for treasury operations
Sector for Succession Affairs of the Former SFRY and Property Management of Bosnia and Herzegovina
Sector for Fiscal Affairs
Sector for financing European Union assistance programs and projects
Internal Audit Department
Sector for Coordination of International Economic Assistance

List of ministers

Ministers of Finance and Treasury of Bosnia and Herzegovina (2000–present)

Political parties:

See also
Economy of Bosnia and Herzegovina

References

External links

Finance and Treasury
Economy of Bosnia and Herzegovina
Bosnia and Herzegovina
Bosnia and Herzegovina, Finance and Treasury